The 2007 Meath Senior Football Championship was the 115th edition of the Meath GAA's premier club Gaelic football tournament for senior graded teams in County Meath, Ireland. The tournament consists of 16 teams, with the winner going on to represent Meath in the Leinster Senior Club Football Championship. The championship starts with a group stage and then progresses to a knock out stage.
 
Wolfe Tones were the defending champions after they defeated Navan O'Mahonys in the previous years final.

Rathkenny were promoted after claiming the 2006 Meath Intermediate Football Championship title, their first Intermediate win since 1934.

On 4 November 2007, Seneschalstown claimed their 3rd Senior Championship title when they defeated Navan O'Mahonys 0–15 to 0–9 after a replay. Captain Cormac Quinn raised the Keegan Cup while Brian Clarke claimed the 'Man of the Match' award.

Ballinlough were relegated after 16 years in the senior grade.

Team changes
The following teams have changed division since the 2006 championship season.

To S.F.C.
Promoted from I.F.C.
 Rathkenny  –  (Intermediate Champions)

From S.F.C.
Relegated to I.F.C.
 Cortown

Group stage
There are 3 groups called Group A, B and C. The 3 top finishers in Group A and the top 2 finishers in Group B and C will qualify for the quarter finals. Third place in Group B will play third place in Group C for a quarter finals place. The 3 teams that finish last in their groups will play in a round-robin relegation play-off.

Group A

Round 1:
 Dunshaughlin 0–11, 0–8 Duleek, Pairc Tailteann, 15 April 2007,
 Summerhill 0–20, 1–6 Ballinlough, Longwood, 15 April 2007,
 Blackhall Gaels 1–14, 1–9 Simonstown Gaels, Kilberry, 15 April 2007,

Round 2:
 Simonstown Gaels 3–7, 0–14 Dunshaughlin, Pairc Tailteann, 4/5/2007,
 Summerhill 2–9, 0–9 Blackhall Gaels, Pairc Tailteann, 6/5/2007,
 Duleek 2–12, 1–7 Ballinlough, Pairc Tailteann, 6/5/2007,

Round 3:
 Summerhill 1–7, 0–10 Simonstown Gaels, Dunsany, 24 July 2007,
 Blackhall Gaels 4–13, 0–7 Duleek, Ratoath, 24 July 2007,
 Dunshaughlin 1–12, 0–6 Ballinlough, Pairc Tailteann, 26 July 2007,

Round 4:
 Dunshaughlin 1–10, 0–12 Blackhall Gaels, Ratoath, 26 August 2007,
 Summerhill 2–15, 0–6 Duleek, Dunsany, 26 August 2007,
 Simonstown Gaels 0–14, 1–2 Ballinlough, Athboy, 26 August 2007,

Round 5:
 Dunshaughlin 0–12, 0–10 Summerhill, Dunderry, 8/9/2007,
 Simonstown Gaels 1–16, 1–9 Duleek, Skryne, 8/9/2007,
 Blackhall Gaels 3–10, 3–4 Ballinlough, Walterstown, 9 September 2007,

Group B

Round 1:
 Skryne 1–12, 0–7 Kilmainhamwood, Walterstown, 15 April 2007,
 St. Peter's Dunboyne 0–12, 1–9 Wolfe Tones, Pairc Tailteann, 15 April 2007,
 Navan O'Mahonys  –  Bye

Round 2:
 Wolfe Tones 1–10, 3–4 Kilmainhamwood, Nobber,
 Navan O'Mahonys 0–12, 0–11 St. Peter's Dunboyne, Dunshaughlin,
 Skryne  –  Bye,

Round 3:
 St. Peter's Dunboyne 2–14, 1–9 Kilmainhamwood, Pairc Tailteann,
 Skryne 0–8, 0–7 Navan O'Mahonys, Seneschalstown, 28 July 2007,
 Wolfe Tones  –  Bye

Round 4:
 Wolfe Tones 1–11, 0–11 Navan O'Mahonys, Pairc Tailteann, 26 August 2007,
 St. Peter's Dunboyne 0–13, 1–9 Skryne, Dunshaughlin,
 Kilmainhamwood  –  Bye,

Round 5:
 Skryne 1–8, 0–9 Wolfe Tones, Pairc Tailteann,
 Navan O'Mahonys 3–8, 0–9 Kilmainhamwood, Carnaross,
 St. Peter's Dunboyne  –  Bye.

Group C

Round 1:
 Trim 0–15, 1–7 St. Patrick's, Dunshaughlin, 16 April 2007,
 Seneschalstown 0–14, 0–8 Walterstown, Pairc Tailteann, 16 April 2007,
 Rathkenny  –  Bye,

Round 2:
 Rathkenny 0–11, 0–10 Trim, Kilberry,
 St. Patrick's 1–8, 1–5 Seneschalstown, Skryne,
 Walterstown  –  Bye,

Round 3:
 Trim 2–7, 0–9 Seneschalstown, Dunshaughlin,
 Rathkenny 0–8, 0–6 Walterstown, Pairc Tailteann, 24 June 2007,
 St. Patrick's  –  Bye,

Round 4:
 Walterstown 2–15, 1–6 Trim, Kilmessan,
 Rathkenny 1–10, 1–10 St. Patrick's, Pairc Tailteann,
 Seneschalstown  –  Bye,

Round 5:
 St. Patrick's 1–9, 0–12 Walterstown, Duleek,
 Seneschalstown 1–12, 0–9 Rathkenny, Pairc Tailteann,
 Trim  –  Bye,

Knock-out Stage

Relegation play-off

Game 1: Walterstown 2–15, 1–14 Kilmainhamwood, Kilberry, /9/2008, (AET)

Relegation Final: Kilmainhamwood 1–12, 0–5 Ballinlough, Kells, 6/10/2008,

Finals
The winners and runners up of each group qualify for the quarter finals along with the third-placed finisher of Group A. 

Preliminary Quarter-final:
 Navan O'Mahonys 0–11, 1–4 St. Patrick's, Pairc Tailteann, 19 September 2007,

Quarter-final:
 St. Peter's Dunboyne 3–10, 1–6 Rathkenny, Pairc Tailteann, 23 September 2007,
 Simonstown Gaels 1–10, 0–10 Skryne, Seneschalstown, 23 July 2007,
 Seneschalstown 2–11, 0–11 Summerhill, Pairc Tailteann, 23 September 2007,
 Navan O'Mahonys 1–14, 1–6 Dunshuaghlin, Walterstown, 30 September 2007,

Semi-final:
 Navan O'Mahonys 4–12, 2–7 St. Peter's Dunboyne, Pairc Tailteann, 7/10/2007,
 Seneschalstown 3–6, 1–9 Simonstown Gaels, Pairc Tailteann, 7/10/2007,

Final:
 Seneschalstown 1–8, 0–11 Navan O'Mahonys, Pairc Tailteann, 21 October 2007,

Final Replay:
 Seneschalstown 0–15, 0–9 Navan O'Mahonys, Pairc Tailteann, 4/11/2007,

References

External links

Meath Senior Football Championship
Meath Senior Football Championship